Round 2 of the 2013 Blancpain Endurance Series season took place at Silverstone Circuit on 2 June 2013. A field of 57 GT3 cars competed in the 3-hour endurance race. The race was won by the Aston Martin V12 Vantage GT3 of Aston Martin Racing, driven by Darren Turner, Fred Makowiecki and Stefan Mucke.

Official results 
Class winners in bold.  Cars failing to complete 70% of winner's distance marked as Not Classified (NC).

References

Silverstone
Blancpain Endurance Series
Blancpain Endurance Series